A chaise is a light two- or four-wheeled traveling or pleasure carriage.

Chaise may also refer to:

Chaise (river), a river in France
Charles-Édouard Chaise (1759–1798), French neoclassical painter
François de la Chaise (1624–1709), French Jesuit priest
Julien Chaisse (born 1976), professor of law at the City University of Hong Kong

See also
 Chaise longue (disambiguation)
 Chaize (disambiguation)